Barrod is a village in Behror Tehsil, Alwar District, Rajasthan, India.  Some times this is also called Bardod. It is situated on State Highway No-14, RJ SH 14. The name is sometimes written as Bardod. Two villages come under the administration of the Barrod panchayat: Barrod and Kankara Barrod.

Villages in Alwar district